Gommatsāra is one of the most important Jain texts authored by Acharya Nemichandra Siddhanta Chakravarti.

History 
Gommatsāra was written by Nemichandra in 10th century CE in Prakrit. It is based on the major Jain text, Shatkhandagam written by the Acharya Bhutabali and Acharya Pushpadant. Sermons on Gommatasara was delivered in 1635 by Rupchand Pande, teacher of Hemraj Pande.

Content 

Gommatasara provides a detailed summary of Digambara doctorine. It is also called Pancha Sangraha, a collection of five topics:
That which is bound, i.e., the Soul (Bandhaka);
That which is bound to the soul;
That which binds;
The varieties of bondage;
The cause of bondage.

The first of these, namely, (Bandhaka) i. e., the mundane soul forms the subject-matter of Jiva Kanda (description of the soul). The other four form the subject-matter of Karma Kanda.

See also
 Karma in Jainism

References

Citations

Sources 
  Alt URL
 
 
 

Jain texts